Camp Bagong Diwa is the headquarters of the National Capital Region Police Office, located in Lower Bicutan, Taguig, Philippines.

Functions
The camp serves many functions: within its gates are enclosed a police academy and the Taguig City Jail, but also several jail "annexes" which house inmates the government believes to be too notorious or too dangerous to be safely housed among the regular population. As of December 2018, the camp contains the Manila City Jail Annex, the Quezon City Jail Annex, and the Metro Manila District Jail Annexes 1, 2, and 3. 

The camp also contains the highest security prisons in the Philippines, the Bureau of Jail Management and Penology's Special Intensive Care Area (SICA) 1 and SICA 2. 

As of 2018, within SICA 1 and 2 were housed accused terrorists of the Moro National Liberation Front, Abu Sayyaf, and Maute groups along with accused communist rebels from the New People's Army (Communist Party of the Philippines).

History

During the Marcos dictatorship, Camp Bagong Diwa was the site of a major detention center for political detainees, with some of the prominent prisoners kept there at different times including journalist Chelo Banal-Formoso, activist couple Mon and Ester Isberto, and in the aftermath of the September 1984 Welcome Rotonda protest dispersal, Senators Lorenzo Tanada and Soc Rodrigo, and future Senators Tito Guingona, Aquilino Pimentel Jr., and Joker Arroyo.

Overcrowding status 
As a general rule, for security reasons, the jails within Camp Bagong Diwa tend to be much less overcrowded than the jails outside; SICA 1 in April 2018 was only 25% overcrowded. However, this is not always the case; Camp Bagong Diwa also contains the Bureau of Immigration Bicutan Detention Center, which as of April 2020, is 278% overcrowded, with a capacity of 150 but a population of 418.

References 

Law enforcement in the Philippines
Philippine National Police headquarters
Buildings and structures in Taguig
Prisons in the Philippines
Detention centers during the Marcos dictatorship